The 1897 Central Michigan Normalites football team represented Central Michigan Normal School, later renamed Central Michigan University, as an independent during the 1897 college football season. Under head coach Carl Pray, the Normalites compiled a 2–1 record, and were outscored 16 to 18 by their opponents.

Schedule

References

Central Michigan
Central Michigan Chippewas football seasons
Central Michigan Normalites football